Wich'iqucha (Quechua wich'i a large, wide-mouthed pitcher, qucha lake, "pitcher lake",  Hispanicized spelling Vichecocha) is a lake in Peru. It is situated in the Junín Region, Jauja Province, Canchayllo District, west of Yuraqqucha. The lake belongs to the watershed of the Mantaro River.

The Wich'iqucha dam was built in 1995. It is operated by Electroperu.

See also
List of lakes in Peru

References

Wichiqucha (Jauja)
Lakes of Junín Region
Dams in Peru
Buildings and structures in Junín Region